Hydroxybupropion (code name BW 306U), or 6-hydroxybupropion, is the major active metabolite of the antidepressant and smoking cessation drug bupropion. It is formed from bupropion by the liver enzyme CYP2B6 during first-pass metabolism. With oral bupropion treatment, hydroxybupropion is present in plasma at area under the curve concentrations that are as many as 16–20 times greater than those of bupropion itself, demonstrating extensive conversion of bupropion into hydroxybupropion in humans. As such, hydroxybupropion is likely to play a very important role in the effects of oral bupropion, which could accurately be thought of as functioning largely as a prodrug to hydroxybupropion. Other metabolites of bupropion besides hydroxybupropion include threohydrobupropion and erythrohydrobupropion.

Pharmacology

Pharmacodynamics
Compared to bupropion, hydroxybupropion is similar in its potency as a norepinephrine reuptake inhibitor (IC50 = 1.7 μM), but is substantially weaker as a dopamine reuptake inhibitor (IC50 = >10 μM). Like bupropion, hydroxybupropion is also a non-competitive antagonist of nACh receptors, such as α4β2 and α3β4, but is even more potent in comparison.

Pharmacokinetics
Bupropion is extensively and rapidly absorbed in the gastrointestinal tract but experiences extensive first pass metabolism rendering its systemic bioavailability limited. Exact bioavailability has yet to be determined given an intravenous form does not exist. Absorption is suggested to be between 80-90%. Its distribution half-life is between 3–4 hours and exhibits moderate human plasma protein binding (between 82–88%) with the parent compound and hydroxybupropion displaying the highest affinity. Bupropion is a racemic mixture and is metabolized hepatically primarily via oxidative cleavage of its side chains by CYP2B6. Hydroxybupropion is the most potent of the metabolites. It is formed via the "hydroxylation of the tert-butyl group" by CYP2B6 and is excreted renally. Cmax vales of hydroxybupropion are 4–7 times that of bupropion, while the exposure to hydroxybupropion is "10 fold" that of bupropion. Hydroxybupropion's elimination half-life is roughly 20 hours, give or take 5 hours and will reach steady state concentrations within 8 days.

Chemistry
Hydroxybupropion is a racemic mixture of (R,R)-hydroxybupropion and (S,S)-hydroxybupropion.

Research
Although there are patents proposing uses and formulations of this compound, hydroxybuproprion is not currently marketed as a drug in and of itself and is only available for use in non-clinical research. Hydroxybupropion is not a scheduled drug or a controlled substance. One can access GLP (Good Lab Practice) documents detailing assays/techniques to further research and isolate this drug. Otherwise, there is little regulatory data available for hydroxybupropion at this time. Moreover, there is little information to suggest hydroxybupropion has an abuse potential. However, it has been studied as a possible therapeutic for alcohol and nicotine use as a codrug.

There are few clinical trials or toxicology studies assessing hydroxybupropion alone at this time. There are clinical studies which assess hydroxybupropion in conjunction with bupropion suggesting hydroxybupropion to be the primary form of the compound responsible for its clinical efficacy. Also, transdermal delivery of bupropion and hydroxybupropion has been assessed finding bupropion to be the superior candidate given its elevated diffusion rate through skin samples. There are few toxicology studies assessing hydroxybupropion alone at this time. However, there are some studies which assess this compound in conjunction with others or its parent compound.

See also 
 Radafaxine – a cyclised derivative of hydroxybupropion
 Manifaxine – an analogue of radafaxine and hydroxybupropion

References 

5-HT3 antagonists
Antidepressants
Cathinones
Chloroarenes
Convulsants
Human drug metabolites
Nicotinic antagonists
Norepinephrine reuptake inhibitors
Primary alcohols
Smoking cessation
Stimulants